The fifth season of Tawag ng Tanghalan, dubbed as Tawag ng Tanghalan: Ikalimang Taon, was an amateur singing competition aired as a segment of the noontime show It's Showtime. The segment premiered from February 8 to September 18, 2021.

From March 18 to April 10, 2021, the season was halted because ABS-CBN decided to temporarily stop holding daily live programs due to surge of COVID-19 cases in the Greater Manila Area. The public thought that it might be the new cases of COVID-19 caused by one of the staff testing positive for the coronavirus or preparing to move to a new studio in ABS-CBN Soundstage at San Jose del Monte, Bulacan. The season resumed on April 12, 2021.

Hosts and judges
Louie Ocampo, Jaya, Erik Santos, Jed Madela, Nyoy Volante, Ogie Alcasid, Zsa Zsa Padilla, Karylle, Karla Estrada, Kyla and Mitoy Yonting returned as judges for the fifth season. 
 
Angeline Quinto, who was originally a guest judge in the previous season, became a regular judge after a successful guesting stint as a TNT Hurado. 
 
Vhong Navarro, Vice Ganda, Jhong Hilario, Amy Perez and Kim Chiu also returned as hosts, and was joined by Karylle as an occasional co-host with Ryan Bang, Teddy Corpuz and Jugs Jugueta serving as co-hosts and gong masters.

K Brosas, Rey Valera and Randy Santiago did not return as Hurados due to their commitments to the revival of Sing Galing!.

Also, after the show returned from its temporary suspension due to the reimposed enhanced community quarantine, the Hurados instead appeared through a work-from-home arrangement via Zoom. The judges returned to the studio since May 24, 2021, for the Quarter Finals Week of Quarter I.

On June 28, 2021, Klarisse de Guzman joined the judging panel.

On July 3, 2021, Jaya announced her departure as a judge as a result of her decision to migrate to the United States.

Changes

Daily rounds 
The mechanics for the daily rounds for this season were modified. Four daily contenders competed for two spots called "spotlight" every Monday to advance to the next day. Two new daily contenders face off then introduced from Tuesdays to Fridays to face off in the first round. The winning daily contender advanced to the second round and challenged the two spotlight holders in a three-way battle. The two remaining spotlight holders at the end of Friday's episode battled each other in two rounds to be crowned the weekly winner.

Grand Final Qualifiers 
Due to undisclosed reasons, the Semifinal Round and Resbak (Wildcard) Rounds, similar to that of season 4, were suddenly axed. All contenders who won from the Quarter Finals automatically advance to the grand finals, dubbed as Ang Huling Tapatan, which will only be composed of contenders who won from the two Quarter Finals. This makes the season, by far, to have the shortest stint for a regular season.

Prizes 
The two winning daily contenders receive , while the losing contenders receive . The weekly winner receives .

Quarter I

Daily Rounds
Color Key:
 
Contender's Information:

Results Details:

 
Italicized names denotes a contender is a resbaker

Quarter II

Daily Rounds
Color Key:
 
Contender's Information:

Results Details:

Italicized names denotes a contender is a resbaker

Week-long Finals

Summary of Daily Winners 
Contender's Information

Results Details:

Quarter I

Quarter II

Quarter-finals 
The quarter finalists are scored of the following criteria: Voice quality (50%) and Overall performance (50%).

For the first quarter finals, the quarter finalist who obtained the highest combined scores on Mondays (first day) and Wednesdays (third day) will receive the "Instant Spotlight" and will be safe from Eliminations on Tuesdays (second day) and Thursdays (fourth day), respectively, while the remaining quarter finalists will continue to perform on the next rounds. The remaining three (3) quarter finalists for each week after the second elimination will perform on the final two (2) rounds on Fridays and Saturdays. The scores on the final two rounds will be combined to determine the top two Quarter Finalists. This format is similar to the Quarter Finals of season 4. The top two (2) Quarter Finalists with the highest combined scores at the end of each week move on to the grand finals (previously announced as semifinals) and receive ₱50,000. A consolation prize of ₱10,000 is given to quarter finalists who failed to advance to the next round.

For the second quarter finals, due to It's Showtime's existing segments of ReIna ng Tahanan and Madlang Pi-POLL, and due to the limitations imposed by the preparation for the reimposition of Enhanced Community Quarantine (ECQ) in Metro Manila, the Quarter Finals was reduced from twelve days into only three days. This divides the quarter finalists into three groups. The winner for each day automatically advances to the grand finals and receive ₱50,000. A consolation prize of ₱10,000 is given to quarter finalists who failed to advance to the next round.

A quarter finalist may be "gonged" during this stage and be eliminated from the competition.

Quarter I Details 
The 11 Quarter Finalists (now 10), divided into five quarter finalists, will compete and perform a song each day for a week.  The First Quarter Finals week aired on May 24 – June 4, 2021.

Shanne Gulle (Mindanao) did not participate in the competition due to the restriction under Modified Enhanced Community Quarantine (MECQ) and she wasn't able to travel in Manila, but she will return in the next quarter finals.

Erika Buensuceso (Luzon) withdrew from the competition on Day 4 of the second Quarter Finals Week due to undisclosed reasons.

Daily Rounds 
Results Details

Quarter II Details 
The 10 Quarter Finalists (now 9), randomly divided into three groups, will compete and perform a song once for a week. The Second Quarter Finals week aired on August 2–6, 2021.

Eufritz Santos (Metro Manila) withdrew from the competition due to health reasons. She crossed over to the sixth season to compete in Quarter I Quarter Finals Week.

Daily Rounds 
Results Details

                               On August 26, 2021 (Thursday), Vice Ganda announced that the round was cancelled due to COVID-19 pandemic in the Philippines.

Final Results 
Results Details

Quarter I

Quarter II

Ang Huling Tapatan (Grand Finals) 
After a six-week hiatus for preparation, the grand finals, dubbed as "Ang Huling Tapatan" (The Final Face-off), aired on September 18, 2021. From August 11 to 21, a teaser, showing a mentoring session with a Hurado, was released pre-commercial break of It's Showtime.

Unlike the week-long showdown during previous seasons, the Grand Finals will only be held in one day. The 8 finalists from Quarter I and Quarter II will now compete for the title of being the Grand Champion of this season.

For the first round, the scores of the grand finalists will only be based on the Hurados Score which will determine who advances to the Final 3. Meanwhile, for the Medley Round of the Final 3, the scores will be based on Hurados' Score (50%) and public votes (50%) through text. Public votes will return in this segment after being excluded during the previous rounds in this season.

There will also be no homecoming, featurette, and Resbak (Wildcard) Rounds this season due to COVID-19 restrictions.

 Summary of Grand Finalists Color Key:Results Details Live Finale Results Details: Top 8 
Theme: Go For Gold Final 3 
Theme: Medley SongsReiven Umali from Luzon emerged as the Grand Champion, followed by Adrian Manibale as the second placer, and Anthony Castillo as the third placer.

 Guest Performances 

 Elimination table 
 Contender's Details:Results Details'''

 

 

 

 Notable contestants 
Quarter I
Froilan Cedilla was a participant of Willie of Fortune, a discontinued and pre-lockdown segment of Wowowin.
JC Flores joined in first season of I Can See Your Voice as one of the mystery singers. He was also a participant of KanTrabaho, a former segment of Lunch Out Loud.
Fin Ramirez joined in second season of I Can See Your Voice as one of mystery singers.
Mia Villaflores auditioned on the first season of The Voice Teens, and joined Team Lea. She was eliminated in the battles. She also joined in Idol Philippines, but she was eliminated in the Do or Die Round.
Sessa Bales is the sister of Tawag ng Tanghalan second season semi finalist JM Bales.
Herbie Pultam joined in first season of I Can See Your Voice as one of the mystery singers.
Zai Miguel joined in Your Moment as a member of the singing trio Lez 2 Men wherein their group finished in third place on the singing category.
Leo John Guinid joined in third season of I Can See Your Voice as one of the mystery singers.
Danica Madrid Reynes competed in Miss World Philippines in 2018 and Miss Universe Philippines in 2020.
Bimmy de Guia joined in first season of I Can See Your Voice as one of the mystery singers.
Kevin Hermogenes participated in the World Championship of Performing Arts (WCOPA) where he won multiple medals. He also joined in Idol Philippines, but he was eliminated in the Solo Round.
Jeya Mestre joined in third season of I Can See Your Voice as one of the mystery singers.
Caroline Pareño joined in third season of I Can See Your Voice as one of the mystery singers.
Josh Labing-isa auditioned on the second season of The Voice Teens, and joined Team Lea. He was eliminated in the knockouts to Cydel Gabutero who eventually won as one of the grand champions of the season.
Noel Pangilinan was a grand finalist of Stars on 45, a former segment of It's Showtime.
Trix Corpez joined in Idol Philippines, but he was eliminated in the Do or Die Round.
Ronald Jaimeer Humarang joined in Little Big Star and finished in fifth place on the Big Division. He also joined in Little Big Superstar and eventually won as the grand champion of the competition.
Marissa Sanchez joined in fourth season of Tawag ng Tanghalan, and she became the weekly winner of Tawag ng Tanghalan sa Tahanan, a virtual edition of the competition wherein the winner could be a daily contender in the studio.
Tanniah Ylagan competed along with Arabelle Dela Cruz in the first season of Born to Be a Star as one of the weekly finalists. She also had a performance with Ogie Alcasid in the same show.
Shanne Gulle recently competed in the second season of The Clash as one of the Top 64 contenders, but she lost to Jessel Lambino.
Niño Gragera is the brother of Tawag ng Tanghalan fourth season quarter finalist Luis Gragera.
Kelly Garcia participated in the World Championship of Performing Arts (WCOPA) where she won multiple medals. She also recently competed in the third season of The Clash as one of the Top 30 contenders, but she lost to Princess Vire.
Rafaella Berso recently competed in the second season of The Clash under the screen name, Rafaella Joy Berso, as one of the Top 32 contenders, but she lost to Aljon Gutierrez.
Jorell Canuel joined in third season of Tawag ng Tanghalan, but he lost. He also joined in Star In A Million and first season of I Can See Your Voice as one of mystery singers.
Michael Brian was a former member of That's Entertainment, a variety show hosted by German Moreno.
Janno Nazareno was a defending champion in third season of Tawag ng Tanghalan, but he lost to Bel Sarmiento.
Mark Anthony Mendoza recently competed in the second season of The Clash under the screen name, Mark Mendoza, as one of Top 32 contenders, but he lost in a double elimination together with Nicole Apolinar.
Cyrill Tumamak joined in Pinoy Boyband Superstar, but he was eliminated in the Middle Rounds.
Jomar Pasaron auditioned on the first season of The Voice Teens and joined Team Lea. He was eliminated in the battles.
Reiven Umali joined in second season of Tawag ng Tanghalan under the screen name, Ros Reiven Umali, but he lost. He also auditioned on the second season of The Voice Teens, but he did not get any of the coaches turn their chairs during the Blind Auditions.
Shairah Cervancia auditioned on the second season of The Voice of the Philippines and joined Team Bamboo, but she was stolen by Team Sarah in the battles. She was eliminated in the Knockouts to Kokoi Baldo and Jason Fernandez.
Krezia Toñacao won as daily winner in second season of Tawag ng Tanghalan under the screen name, Krezia Mae Toñacao, but she lost to Ato Arman. She also returned in third season, but she lost. She also joined in Duet with Me, a segment of Studio 7.
Marc Dy was a contestant of Mr. Q&A, a former segment of It's Showtime.
Rene Pansoy auditioned on the fifth season of Pilipinas Got Talent, but he did not advance to the next round.
Marvin Ilagan won as daily winner in second season of Tawag ng Tanghalan, but he lost to Remy Luntayao.
Lars Delariman joined in third season of I Can See Your Voice as one of the mystery singers.
Yang-Yang Aloya auditioned on the second season of The Voice Teens and joined Team apl.de.ap. She became one of the Top 3 grand finalists, but she lost to Isang Manlapaz who eventually won as one of the grand champions of the season.
Jerold Tamayo joined in second season of I Can See Your Voice as one of the mystery singers. He also joined in the second season of Born to Be a Star.
Via Samantha Mojado competed in Protégé: The Battle for the Big Break as one of the Top 30 contenders, but she was eliminated in the Face Off Round.
Giselle Saguban joined in third season of Tawag ng Tanghalan, but she lost.
Maki Marzan won as daily winner in first season of Tawag ng Tanghalan under the screen name, Michael Jhon Marzan, but he lost to Hazelyn Cascaño.
Ruben Arellano Jr. is the brother of Tawag ng Tanghalan fourth season quarter finalist Rommel Arellano.
Jhoas Sumatra auditioned on the second season of The Voice Kids and joined Team Lea. He was eliminated in the battles.

Quarter II
Lorraine Galvez won as daily winner in third season of Tawag ng Tanghalan, but she lost to Charizze Arnigo. She also auditioned on the first season of The Voice Teens under the screen name, Alessandra Galvez and joined Team Sharon, but she was eliminated in the Live Shows to Jeremy Glinoga. She also recently competed in the second season of The Clash, as one of the Top 12 contenders and finished in tenth place.
Jessel Antonio recently competed in the second season of The Clash under the screen name, Jessel Lambino, as one of the Top 16 contenders, but she lost to Aljon Gutierrez.
Anthony Castillo is a member of Pinopela, a Filipino a cappella group.
Tombi Romulo recently competed in second season of The Clash, as one of the Top 12 contenders and finished in eleventh place.
Bea Sacramento joined in first season of Tawag ng Tanghalan, but she lost. She also recently competed in the first season of The Clash, as one of the Top 62 contenders, but she lost to Alliyah Cadeliña.
Joev Gigantone won as daily winner twice in second season of Tawag ng Tanghalan, under the screen name, Joevarry Gigantone, but he lost to Joel Delalamon in Quarter 1 and Jayson Guillermo in Quarter 3 respectively.
Rochell Ann Tolentino was a defending champion in third season of Tawag ng Tanghalan, but she lost to Aisa Ramos.
Evonie Marianito joined in the second season of Born to Be a Star.
Russell Solis auditioned on the second season of The Voice Teens and joined Team Sarah. He was eliminated in the battles.
Anjo Sarnate joined in first season of Tawag ng Tanghalan, but he lost. He also joined in third season of I Can See Your Voice as one of the mystery singers.
Rachel Libres was part of the girl group After 5 since joining the first season of Born to Be a Star. She also joined in Idol Philippines as one of the Top 12 contenders and finished in eleventh place.
Aerone Mendoza was a 2-time defending champion in second season of Tawag ng Tanghalan, but he lost to Aila Santos. He also recently competed in third season of The Clash, as one of the Top 16 contenders, but he lost to Sheemee Buenaobra.
Paula Macalalad was a 3-time defending champion in third season of Tawag ng Tanghalan, but she lost to Edward Paul Mapula.
Adrian Manibale joined in second season of Tawag ng Tanghalan, but he lost. He also recently competed in the second season of The Clash, under the screen name, Adrian Villareal, as one of the Top 32 contenders, but he lost to Clark Serafin.
Recelle Ordas joined in first season of Tawag ng Tanghalan, but she lost. She returned in second season, and won as daily winner, but she lost to Charles Kevin Tan. She was also a participant of KanTrabaho, a former segment of Lunch Out Loud.
Kyle Pasajol won as daily winner in third season of Tawag ng Tanghalan, but he lost to Charizze Arnigo. He also recently competed in the third season of The Clash, as one of the Top 16 contenders, but he lost to Princess Vire.
Al Fritz Blanche joined in third season of Tawag ng Tanghalan, but he lost. He also joined in Wishcovery of Wish 107.5 and recently competed in the second season of The Clash, as one of the Top 12 contenders and finished in twelfth place.
Anne Raz recently competed in the first season of The Clash, as one of the Top 32 contenders, but she lost to Garrett Bolden.
Enrico Villaruz recently competed in the second season of The Clash, as one of the Top 64 contenders, but he lost to Al Fritz Blanche.
Adora Sargento won as daily winner in second season of Tawag ng Tanghalan, but she lost to Christian Bahaya.
Alvin Ortega was a participant of KanTrabaho, a former segment of Lunch Out Loud.
Ingrid Payaket was a grand finalist on the first season of Pilipinas Got Talent and finished in fourth place.
Nica Reyes joined in first season of I Can See Your Voice as one of the mystery singers.
Marco Ignacio was a participant of KanTrabaho, a former segment of Lunch Out Loud.
Inday Humba Dela Cruz joined in second season of Tawag ng Tanghalan, under the screen name, Roberto Dela Cruz Jr., but she lost to John Mark Saga on the first day of the season.
Gem Cristian is the son of Tawag ng Tanghalan second season first runner up Ato Arman.
Ina Bensurto won as daily winner in first season of Tawag ng Tanghalan under the screen name, Reyina Bensuerto, but she lost to Jessa Montefalcon.
Juvanesa Plaza won as daily winner in third season of Tawag ng Tanghalan, but she lost to Chad Binoya.
Joshua Talusig joined in first season of I Can See Your Voice as one of the mystery singers.
Trisha Estrella was a defending champion in third season of Tawag ng Tanghalan, but she lost to Jannine Cartagena.
Andre Parker auditioned on the second season of The Voice Teens and joined Team Sarah. He became one of the Top 3 grand finalists, but he lost to Kendra Aguirre who eventually won as one of the grand champions of the season. He also joined in Tawag ng Tanghalan Kids, under the screen name, Andre Tamura, but he lost to John Cedric Ramirez in the Ultimate Resbak Round.
Mark Ryan Tabag won as daily winner in third season of Tawag ng Tanghalan, but he lost to Jonas Oñate. He also joined in Just Duet, a former segment of Eat Bulaga!.
Eufritz Santos won as daily winner in second season of Tawag ng Tanghalan, but she lost to Lalaine Araña. She also auditioned on the first season of The Voice Kids and joined Team Lea. She was eliminated in the sing-offs. She also joined in third season of I Can See Your Voice as one of the mystery singers.
Lemuel Santos joined in first season of Tawag ng Tanghalan, but he lost. He also auditioned on the sixth season of Pilipinas Got Talent, as the lead vocalist of LS Band, but they were eliminated in the Judges Cull Round. He also joined in Birit King, a former segment of Eat Bulaga!.
Julian Juangco auditioned on the first season of The Voice Teens and joined Team Lea. He was eliminated in the Knockouts to Chan Millanes.
Gyweneth Ravago joined in third season of Tawag ng Tanghalan, but she lost.
Everod Bancifra joined in third season of Tawag ng Tanghalan, but he lost.
Erika Tenorio auditioned on the first season of The Voice Teens and joined Team Sarah. She was eliminated in the battles to Nisha Bedaña. She also joined in Idol Philippines, but she was eliminated in the Do or Die Round.
Sherrie Igne joined in first season of Tawag ng Tanghalan'', but she lost.

References
 
Notes

Scores

Sources

External links
 Tawag ng Tanghalan
 

Tawag ng Tanghalan seasons
2021 Philippine television seasons